Stare Hołowczyce  is a village in the administrative district of Gmina Sarnaki, within Łosice County, Masovian Voivodeship, in east-central Poland.

The village has a population of 208.

References

Villages in Łosice County
Siedlce Governorate
Kholm Governorate
Lublin Voivodeship (1919–1939)